This is a list of flag bearers who have represented Virgin Islands at the Olympics.

Flag bearers carry the national flag of their country at the opening ceremony of the Olympic Games.

See also
Virgin Islands at the Olympics

References

Virgin Islands at the Olympics
Virgin Islands
Olympic flagbearers